The sixteenth series of Made in Chelsea, a British structured-reality television programme began airing on 8 October 2018 on E4, and concluded on 24 December 2018 following eleven episodes, and a "Big Christmas Quiz" special episode presented by Mollie King and Matt Edmondson. Ahead of the series it was announced that Georgia "Toff" Toffolo, Francis Boulle and Sam Prince would not be returning to the series. Alik Alfus was also absent from the series following his appearance on Celebs Go Dating. Instead, new cast members include Tristan Phipps and Eliza Batten. Former cast member Emily Blackwell returned to this series as a regular once again whereas Fran Newman-Young, Millie Wilkinson, Mimi Bouchard and Binky Felstead all made a brief one-off return. This series heavily focused on both Olivia and Digby coming to terms with the breakdown of their relationship before an illegitimate kiss with Miles gives them a huge decision to make. It also includes a brief romance for Sam and Habbs, and Fred and Sophie revisiting their spark, and Miles continuing to annoy the women in his life. During the series it was announced that original cast member Ollie Locke had quit the show, therefore this was his final series.

Cast

Episodes

{| class="wikitable plainrowheaders" style="width:100%; background:#fff;"
! style="background:#03EE91;"| Seriesno.
! style="background:#03EE91;"| Episodeno.
! style="background:#03EE91;"| Title
! style="background:#03EE91;"| Original air date
! style="background:#03EE91;"| Duration
! style="background:#03EE91;"| UK viewers

|}

Ratings
For the first time, catch-up service totals were added to the official ratings.

External links

References

2018 British television seasons
Made in Chelsea seasons